This article lists events that occurred during 1919 in Estonia.

Incumbents
Prime Minister – Konstantin Päts
Prime Minister – Otto Strandman

Events
 9 May – Otto Strandman's cabinet is formed.
 Estonian War of Independence: Bolsheviks were driven out from Estonia.
 10 October – Agrarian Law passed redistributing many of the estates owned by Baltic Germans and Estonian landowners.
 1 December – Tartu University is re-opened.

Births
10 March – Pavel Bogovski, Estonian oncologist and anatomy pathologist

Deaths
 February 2 – Julius Kuperjanov, Estonian military commander (b. 1894)
April 27 – Anton Irv, Estonian military officer (b. 1886)

References

 
1910s in Estonia
Estonia
Estonia
Years of the 20th century in Estonia